Cercel is a Romanian surname (literally "Earring"). Notable people with the surname include:

Alina Cercel-Tecșor (born 1979), tennis player
Marcu Cercel (1580-1629), Prince of Moldavia from July to September 1600
Petru Cercel (died 1590), Prince of Wallachia from 1583 to 1585

Romanian-language surnames